Juan Gálvez (1774, Mora - 12 December 1846, Madrid) was a Spanish artist who served as court painter for King Ferdinand VII and Director of the Real Academia de Bellas Artes de San Fernando.

Life and work 
He began painting for the court of King Charles IV at the age of twenty; doing decorative work at the Casita del Príncipe and the Royal Palace of El Pardo. In 1801, he began working in Aranjuez, painting ceilings at the Royal Palace and the Casa del Labrador. Five years later, he was given an official position under the direction of Mariano Salvador Maella.

In the early stages of hostilities in the Peninsular War, he and Fernando Brambila were invited to Zaragoza by General José de Palafox to make sketches documenting the damage suffered during the First Siege, together with the most important military encounters. These were issued in a series of thirty-two plates called the Grabados de la Ruina de Zaragoza, which was published in Cádiz.

At the end of the war, he continued to work for the court. He painted a portrait of King Ferdinand VII and was named a member of the Real Academia de Bellas Artes de San Fernando. In 1816, upon the death of the Italian-born artist, Luis Japelli, he succeeded to the office of Court Painter. In 1829, he became Director of the Academia. During this period, he executed numerous commissions from the King for painted vaults and ceilings.

References

Further reading 
 Juan Martínez Cuesta, "Juan Gálvez y Leandro Fernández de Moratín. Cuatro escenas, obra de Gálvez, inspiradas en las comedias de Moratín" In: Espacio, Tiempo y Forma, series VII, H.ª del Arte, I. 12, 1999, págs. 221-243.
 Galería biográfica de artistas españoles del siglo XIX, Manuel Ossorio y Bernard (Ed.) 1868, Imprenta de Ramón Moreno Online

External links

 Fernando Brambila y Juan Gálvez, Ruinas de Zaragoza. Estampas del Primer Sitio de Zaragoza, 1808-1813.
 Juan Gálvez, Museo del Prado.
Digitalized works of Juan Gálvez in the Biblioteca Digital Hispánica of the Biblioteca Nacional de España

1774 births
1846 deaths
Spanish painters
Court painters
Spanish muralists
People from the Province of Toledo